Fermín Toro y Blanco (Caracas- El Valle, 14 July 1806 - Caracas, 23 December 1865) was a Venezuelan humanist, politician, diplomat and author.

Biography
Within his public life he was Minister of Foreign Affairs, twice Minister of Finance (in 1847 and in 1858), President of the National Convention of 1858, President of the Chamber of Deputies, Plenipotentiary Minister to the United Kingdom, Spain, France and Colombia, and Presidential candidate in two occasions. Together with the Government of the Spanish Queen Isabel II he signed in 1846 the Ratification of the Treaty of Recognition of Venezuela's Independence by Spain, the former colonial metropolis. Subsequently, a ball on his honour was offered by the Queen. He also negotiated border delimitations with Colombia and relevant political issues with European capitals.

He is also remembered for his writings and oratorical skills. Even though he was the author of the first Venezuelan novel he is better known for his economic and political essays. The relevance attained by his essays is shown by the fact that he was quoted by Leo Tolstoy in Resurrection. He was also active as a philologist and a botanist. He is considered by many as the best orator in Venezuela's parliamentary history.

Within Venezuela's history, he epitomizes the strength of moral character against the oppressive force of government, as expressed by his stance against the attack on Congress ordered on 24 January 1848 by President Jose Tadeo Monagas. All Venezuelans learn in school the famous phrase by which he responded to Monagas' envoys, which wanted him to validate the violation of Congress: "Go and tell General Monagas that my dead body can be carried, but Fermin Toro doesn't prostitute himself".

Death and legacy
His remains were located at the Panteón Nacional on 23 April 1876. Several universities and schools have been named in his honour, including the Liceo Fermin Toro, Venezuela's largest and more prestigious public school. He has been the object of several biographies. One of Caracas main avenues is named after him, while his statue is at the entrance of the Liceo Fermin Toro. The Venezuelan National Congress has four lateral squares, each of which bears the name of a famous parliamentarian, with one of them honoring him.

Family
He belonged to the family of the Marquess del Toro of Caracas (his great grandfather, Francisco Rodríguez del Toro e Isturiz, had been a colonial Governor and Captain General of Venezuela), and he was closely related to Francisco Rodríguez del Toro and Fernando Rodriguez del Toro, important figures of the Venezuelan Independence process and to Maria Teresa Rodriguez del Toro y Alayza, the wife of Simón Bolívar.

Works 
Among his publications are the following ones:
 Essay
 Reflexiones sobre la Ley del 10 de abril de 1834.
Los estudios filosóficos en Venezuela, Europa y América
Cuestión de imprenta.
Descripción de los honores fúnebres consagrados a los restos del Libertador Simón Bolívar (1842)
Discurso ante la Convención de Valencia (1858)
Ensayo gramatical sobre el idioma guajiro, (the manuscript was compiled by Adolf Ernst in 1872)
Novels
 Los Mártires (1842).
 La Viuda de Corinto (1837)
 La Sibila de los Andes.

Institutions named after Fermín Toro 
 Universidad Fermín Toro, Barquisimeto
 Colegio Universitario Fermín Toro, Barquisimeto
 Liceo Fermín Toro, Caracas (:es:Liceo Fermín Toro)
 Instituto de Estudios Parliamentarios Fermín Toro

See also
List of Ministers of Foreign Affairs of Venezuela

References

External links 
 Discurso ante la Convención (1858) Discurso de Fermín Toro en el portal de Venezuela Analítica.
 Los Mártires de Fermín Toro. Primera novela venezolana Análisis de Luis Inigo Madrigal en el portal del instituto Cervantes (Centro Virtual Cervantes).
 Fermín Toro: Teoría racional de la sociedad y republicanismo cívico Investigación de Rafael García Torres para la revista Utopía y Praxis Latinoamericana de la Universidad del Zulia. Trabajo ubicado en el portal de la Red de Revistas Científicas de América Latina, el Caribe, España y Portugal; Universidad Autónoma del Estado de México. En ese trabajo se bosqueja las ideas de Fermín Toro acerca de un modelo de desarrollo de Venezuela sobre bases libertarias, justas y de igualdad social.
 Discurso ante la Convención (1858) 

  

1806 births
1865 deaths
People from Caracas
Venezuelan male writers
Venezuelan Ministers of Foreign Affairs
Finance ministers of Venezuela
Central University of Venezuela alumni
Academic staff of the Central University of Venezuela
Venezuelan people of Canarian descent
Venezuelan people of Spanish descent
Ambassadors of Venezuela to the United Kingdom
Ambassadors of Venezuela to Spain
Ambassadors of Venezuela to France
Ambassadors of Venezuela to Colombia
Burials at the National Pantheon of Venezuela